MV Ulster Queen was a passenger ferry operated across the Irish Sea by P&O Ferries between 1967 and 1981.

History
Ulster Queen was the second of three new car ferries delivered to Coast Lines in 1966/67 to update the Irish Sea services of the Belfast Steamship Company. She was built by Cammell Laird in Birkenhead. With her sister,  she took over the Liverpool - Belfast night service, replacing the pre-war motorships  and Ulster Prince (2). The smaller, third new ferry,  took over the Ardrossan - Belfast day service of Burns & Laird. Coast Lines were taken over by P&O in  1971 and the ferries subsequently took on the P&O Ferries colours, with pale blue funnels.

The service closed in 1981 and both ships were laid up in Ostend. Ulster Queen saw further service as Med Sea, Al Kahera and Ala-Eddin. In 1988, she was bought by Hellenic Mediterranean Lines, and renamed Poseidonia.

On 2 November  2005, she caught fire during a voyage from Suez to Jeddah. One crew member was lost. The following day, she sank on Hyndman Reef, Safaga and lies as a wreck.

Service
1967-1981: Liverpool-Belfast
1982-1985: Cyprus - Syria
1986: Red Sea
1988-2003 : Igoumenitsa - Brindisi (1988-1998)

References

Ferries of the United Kingdom
1967 ships
Ships of P&O Ferries
Ships built on the River Mersey